The Kangnas Wind Power Station is an operational  wind power plant in South Africa. The power station was developed and is owned by a consortium of international IPPs and financiers. Commercial operations started in November 2020. The energy generated at this wind farm is sold to the South African national electricity utility company Eskom, under a 20-year power purchase agreement (PPA).

Location

Overview
The power station was built, funded and is operated by a consortium referred to as the Lekela Power Consortium, as part of the South African government's Renewable Energy Independent Power Producer Procurement Program (REIPPP). This wind farm, together with four other operational wind power stations in South Africa, comprise a source of 600 megawatts of clean renewable energy owned and operated by the Lekela Consortium.

The power station is made of 61 wind turbines of the Siemens SWT-2.3-108 variety, each rated at 2.3 megawatts for total capacity of 140.3 MW.

Each turbine is connected to an onsite electric substation, by an array of medium voltage wires. At the onsite substation, the energy is stepped up to "high voltage" numbers and evacuated to enter the Eskom national grid. In addition to the electric infrastructure, a network of roads has been developed within the wind farm. Also, a series of "crane hardstands" have been  constructed to facilitate future maintenance of the wind turbines and related equipment.

Developers
The able below illustrates the ownership of Lekela Power Consortium.

Construction and timeframe
The Spanish-German conglomerate, Siemens Gamesa Renewable Energy S.A., handled the engineering, procurement and construction contract for this wind farm. Construction began in 2018 and concluded in late 2020.

Other considerations
It is calculated that the wind farm adds 513.2GWh to the South African national grid every year. This power is sufficient to supply an estimated 154,625 South African homes. At the peak of construction an estimated 550 people were employed at the site. The Kangnas Renewable Energy Community Trust, was established at financial close, and was gifted 15 percent shareholding in the power station.

See also

 List of power stations in South Africa
 Wesley–Ciskei Wind Power Station
 Oyster Bay Wind Power Station
 Garob Wind Power Station

References

External links
 South Africa: Kangnas wind farm to be commissioned by end 2020 As of 26 July 2019.
 Approximate Location of Kangnas Wind Power Station.

Economy of the Northern Cape
Wind farms in South Africa
Energy infrastructure in Africa
2020 establishments in South Africa
Energy infrastructure completed in 2020
21st-century architecture in South Africa